Marian Rentgen (born Marian Antoni Güntner; 23 June 1888 – April 1940) was a Polish actor and director. He was active in theatre and film between 1913 and 1938. He was killed in the Katyn massacre in April 1940.

Selected filmography
Sto metrów miłości (1932)
Jego ekscelencja subiekt (1933)

References

External links

1888 births
1940 deaths
People from Bochnia
Polish male stage actors
Polish male film actors
20th-century Polish male actors
Polish civilians killed in World War II
Katyn massacre victims